Svea Township may refer to the following townships in the United States:

 Svea Township, Kittson County, Minnesota
 Svea Township, Barnes County, North Dakota